Andrea Williams may refer to:

 Andrea Williams (quilter) aka Andrea Pettway Williams (born 1973), American artist. 
 Andrea Williams (sports executive)
 Andrea Minichiello Williams, lawyer and Christian campaigner